East Guildford railway station is a Transperth railway station 14 km from Perth railway station, in Western Australia, on the Midland Line.

History
The station opened on 13 July 1896 as Woodbridge and served the Royal Agricultural Society's Woodbridge Showgrounds. It was renamed East Guildford on 1 April 1908. Since the change was at the request of the Guildford Municipal Council, the council was charged £35 5s 6d for the cost of changing the name on tickets and station signboards. The station was remodelled in the late 1960s.

Rail services
East Guildford railway station is served by the Midland railway line on the Transperth network. This line goes between Midland railway station and Perth railway station. Midland line trains stop at the station every 10 minutes during peak on weekdays, and every 15 minutes during the day outside peak every day of the year except Christmas Day. Trains are half-hourly or hourly at night time. The station saw 84,415 passengers in the 2013-14 financial year.

Bus routes

References

Railway stations in Perth, Western Australia
Midland line, Perth
East Guildford, Western Australia